The Department of Prisons (Sinhala: බන්ධනාගාර දෙපාර්තමේන්තුව Bandhanagara Departhamenthuwa) is a department of the Government of Sri Lanka responsible for the incarceration and rehabilitation of convicted criminal offenders and terror suspects, coming under the purview of the Minister of Prison Reforms, Rehabilitation, Resettlement and Hindu Religious Affairs. The Commissioner-General of Prisons reports to the Subject Minister, who is in turn responsible to the Parliament of Sri Lanka.

The current Commissioner-General of Prisons is Thushara Upuldeniya.

History
The new prisons system that evolved in Britain was introduced to the British colonies during 1844. The Department of Prisons came into existence first affiliated to the Police Dept. under the then Inspector General of Police Sir George William Robert Campbell under the Act no.18 of 1844. The supervision and control of all prisons in the Island were vested in Inspector General of Prisons. From its inceptions the office of Inspector General of Prisons was held by the Inspector General of Police until 1905 when they separated. Major Albert De Wilton who till then held both offices was appointed Inspector General of Prisons and he was also appointed to be the Superintendent of the Prisons at Welikada, Mutwal and Hultsdorf. In 1922 the penal colony of the Andaman Islands were closed down and 62 life convicts sent back to Ceylon. In 1944 a probation system was introduced as a branch of the Prison Department. In 2022, the Sri Lanka Prisons Emergency Action and Tactical Force was formed under the Prison Department to provide specialist security and riot control within the prison system.

Responsibilities
The Department of Prisons is tasked with ensuring that custodial sentences (imprisonment) and non-custodial sentences and orders (home detention, supervision, community work and release on conditions) imposed by Sri Lankan Courts are administered in a safe, secure, humane and effective way. The Department aims to contribute to the maintenance of a safe and just society by reducing the level of re-offending through the delivery of targeted and appropriate programmes to help offender's rehabilitation and reintegration to society.
The Department is also responsible for the transportation of prisoners within the country with the assistance of the Sri Lanka Police.

Facilities 
 Prison Headquarters, Colombo
 Sri Lanka Prisons Emergency Action and Tactical Force 
 The Centre for Research and Training in Corrections
Maximum security prisons - 03
 Welikada Prison
 Bogambara Prison
 Mahara Prison
Remand Prisons - 17
Work Camps – 06
Open Prison Camps – 02
 Pallekele Open Prisons Camp
Correctional Centers for Youthful Offenders –02
Training School for Youthful Offenders – 01
Work Release Center – 01
Lock–ups  –28 (Prison buildings sited near courts to which prisoners with pending cases are transferred.)

Ranks

Officers
Commissioner General of Prisons
Additional Commissioner General of Prisons   	
Commissioner of Prisons
Deputy Commissioner of Prisons 	
Senior Superintendent of Prisons
Superintendent of Prisons	
Assistant Superintendent of Prisons

Jailors
Chief Jailor, Chief Welfare Officer 	
Jailor Class 1, Class 1 Welfare Officer
Jailor Class 2, Class 2 Welfare Officer

Guards and other staff
Sergeant 	
Guard  	
Watcher
Labour

Uniform
Department of prisons officers, jailers, sergeant and guards wear a khaki uniform similar to that of police officers with the exception of their use of a khaki peak cap.

See also
 Crime in Sri Lanka
 Judiciary of Sri Lanka
 Law of Sri Lanka
 Sri Lanka Prisons Emergency Action and Tactical Force

References

External links
Official website

Prisons
Law enforcement in Sri Lanka
Prison and correctional agencies